A Long Way from Nowhere is a 1970 American short documentary film produced by Bob Aller. The film traces the progress of four autistic children over one year in a behavioral modification program conducted by psychologist Ivar Lovaas. The sound recording and design was by Gloria Aller. The film was nominated for an Academy Award for Best Documentary Short.

References

External links

1970 films
1970 independent films
1970s short documentary films
American short documentary films
American independent films
1970s English-language films
1970s American films